The following is a list of notable natives, residents, or former residents of Fort Wayne, Indiana.

Artists, designers, and architects
Bill Blass, fashion designer 
Bob Englehart, editorial cartoonist
Richard "Grass" Green, cartoonist
John Hambrock, cartoonist
Eric Kuhne, architect
Dick Moores, cartoonist 
Gray Morrow, comic book illustrator, art director for Spider-Man
Bruce Nauman, artist
Richard Nunez, artist 
Frederick William Sievers, sculptor
Alvin M. Strauss, architect
Brentwood S. Tolan, architect
Thomas J. Tolan, architect
George Washington Whistler, railroad engineer

Athletes

Baseball
Isabel Álvarez, All-American Girls Professional Baseball League player
Lenna Arnold, All-American Girls Professional Baseball League player (1946 Fort Wayne Daisies)
Phyllis Bookout, All-American Girls Professional Baseball League player (1953 Fort Wayne Daisies)
Rob Bowen, MLB (2003–2008) Minnesota Twins,  San Diego Padres,  Chicago Cubs, Oakland Athletics
Dottie Wiltse Collins, All-American Girls Professional Baseball League (1944–1950; Minneapolis Millerettes, Fort Wayne Daisies)
David Doster, MLB (1996, 1999) Philadelphia Phillies
Bill Everitt, MLB (1895–1901) Chicago Colts/Orphans, Washington Senators
Louie Heilbroner,  manager,  MLB (1900) St. Louis Cardinals
Butch Henline, MLB (1921–1931) New York Giants, Philadelphia Phillies, Brooklyn Robins, Chicago White Sox
Harold Greiner (1907–1993), All-American Girls Professional Baseball League manager (Fort Wayne Daisies) and restaurant entrepreneur
Kevin Kiermaier, MLB player (2013–present) Tampa Bay Rays
Naomi Meier, All-American Girls Professional Baseball League player
Ralph Miller, MLB (1920–1924) Philadelphia Phillies,  Washington Senators
Jarrod Parker, MLB pitcher, Arizona Diamondbacks (2011) and Oakland Athletics (2012–2013)
Eric Wedge, player, MLB (1991–1994) Boston Red Sox,  Colorado Rockies;  manager, MLB (2003–2009) Cleveland Indians, (2011–2013)Seattle Mariners
Steve Hargan, MLB pitcher (1965–1972, 1974–1977) Cleveland Indians, Texas Rangers, Toronto Blue Jays, Atlanta Braves
Josh VanMeter, MLB utility (2019–present) Cincinnati Reds, Arizona Diamondbacks
Professional basketball
Dan Godfread, NBA (1990/91–1991/92) Minnesota Timberwolves,  Houston Rockets
Henry James, NBA (1990/91–1997/98) Cleveland Cavaliers, Utah Jazz, Sacramento Kings, Los Angeles Clippers, Houston Rockets, Atlanta Hawks
Kyle Macy, NBA (1980/81–1986/87) Phoenix Suns, Chicago Bulls, Indiana Pacers; sportscaster
Mason Plumlee, NBA (2013–present) Brooklyn Nets, Portland Trail Blazers, Denver Nuggets, Detroit Pistons, Charlotte Hornets
Miles Plumlee, NBA (2012–present) Indiana Pacers, Phoenix Suns, Milwaukee Bucks, Charlotte Hornets, Atlanta Hawks, Memphis Grizzlies
Bill Roberts, NBA (1948/49–1949/50) Chicago Stags, Boston Celtics, St. Louis Bombers
Caleb Swanigan, NBA (2017–2022) Portland Trail Blazers, Sacramento Kings
College basketball
Deshaun Thomas, player for Ohio State

Professional football
Scott Auer, NFL (1984–1985) Kansas City Chiefs
Mike Augustyniak, NFL (1981–1983) New York Jets
Jason Baker, NFL (2001–2012) San Francisco 49ers, Philadelphia Eagles, Kansas City Chiefs, Indianapolis Colts, Denver Broncos, Carolina Panthers
Bill Boedeker, NFL (1946–1950) Chicago Rockets, Cleveland Browns, Philadelphia Eagles, Green Bay Packers
Johnny Bright, CFL (1952–1964), Calgary Stampeders, Edmonton Eskimos,  subject of the "Johnny Bright Incident"
Vaughn Dunbar, NFL (1992–1995) New Orleans Saints, Jacksonville Jaguars 
Tyler Eifert, NFL (2013–present) Cincinnati Bengals, Jacksonville Jaguars
Eric England, NFL (1994–1996) Arizona Cardinals
Trai Essex, NFL (2005–2012) Pittsburgh Steelers, Super Bowl XL and Super Bowl XLIII champion
Jason Fabini, NFL (1998–2008) New York Jets, Dallas Cowboys, Washington Redskins
James Hardy, NFL (2008–2011) Buffalo Bills
Selwyn Lymon, NFL (no professional games played) Miami Dolphins
Austin Mack, NFL (2020–present) New York Giants
Jessie Bates III, NFL (2018–present) Cincinnati Bengals
Le'Ron McClain, NFL (2007–2013) Baltimore Ravens, Kansas City Chiefs, San Diego Chargers
Bernard Pollard, NFL (2006–2014) Kansas City Chiefs, Houston Texans, Baltimore Ravens, Tennessee Titans
Emil Sitko, NFL (1950–1952) San Francisco 49ers, Chicago Cardinals
Ben Skowronek, NFL (2021–present) Los Angeles Rams
Jaylon Smith, NFL (2016–present) Dallas Cowboys, Green Bay Packers, New York Giants
Lamar Smith, NFL (1994–2003) Seattle Seahawks, New Orleans Saints, Miami Dolphins, Carolina Panthers
Rod Smith, NFL (2015–present) Seattle Seahawks, Dallas Cowboys, Tennessee Titans, Oakland Raiders
Anthony Spencer, NFL (2007–2015) Dallas Cowboys, New Orleans Saints
Drue Tranquill, NFL (2019–present) Los Angeles Chargers
Elmer Wilkens, NFL (1925) Green Bay Packers
Rod Woodson, NFL (1987–2003) Pittsburgh Steelers, San Francisco 49ers, Baltimore Ravens, Oakland Raiders, Pro Football Hall of Famer
Golf
Amanda Blumenherst, U.S. Amateur champion
Cathy Gerring, 3-time winner on LPGA Tour
Billy Kratzert, 4-time winner on PGA Tour, sportscaster
Professional Hockey
Drake Batherson, NHL Ottawa Senators
Gracen Hirschy, SDHL (2017–present), Linköping HC
Fred Knipscheer, NHL Boston Bruins, St. Louis Blues
Dale Purinton, NHL (1999/2000–2003/04) New York Rangers
Martial arts
Jon Fitch, MMA fighter with UFC
Dave Herman, MMA fighter with UFC
Becky Levi, MMA fighter
Soccer
DaMarcus Beasley, Rangers F.C. of the Scottish Premier League, U.S. national team, MLS Chicago Fire
Jamar Beasley, MLS New England Revolution, Chicago Fire
Rece Buckmaster, New York Red Bulls
Olympic swimming and diving
Matt Vogel, swimmer, two-time Olympic gold medalist, 1976 Summer Olympics
Sharon Wichman, swimmer, Olympic gold medalist, 1968 Summer Olympics
Steve Bigelow, swimmer, 1988 Summer Olympics
Dan Zehr, swimmer, 1932 Summer Olympics
Olympic track and field
Eric Morrical, 400m
LeShundra "DeDee" Nathan, 2000 Summer Olympics
Volleyball
Angie Akers, professional beach volleyball player
Lloy Ball, Olympic gold medalist, 2008 Summer Olympics
Dr. Don Shondell, author, head coach of Ball State University Cardinals men's volleyball program (1964–1998)
Other notables
Angela Bradburn-Spangler, USA national high jump champion 1994
Eugene E. Parker, sports agent, 45th in Sports Illustrateds 101 most influential minorities in sports
Ed Viesturs, mountaineer, first American to climb all 14 of the world's 8,000 meter peaks, and the fifth person ever to do so without the use of supplemental oxygen

Authors and writers
E. Jean Carroll, author, journalist
Constance Cumbey, author, lawyer
Les Edgerton, author
Ashley C. Ford, author and essayist
Edith Hamilton, author, mythology expert
Stephen King, best-selling author (spent parts of childhood in the city)
Ross Lockridge Jr., novelist
Patricia Lockwood, American writer
Michael Martone, author
George Jean Nathan, author, drama critic, founder of American Spectator
William Rockhill Nelson, founder of the Kansas City Star
Emmanuel Ortiz, poet, writer
Charlie Savage, New York Times reporter, 2007 Pulitzer Prize winner

Business leaders
Gregory W. Becker, final CEO of Silicon Valley Bank (SVB)
Andrew George Burry, philanthropist, paper box manufacturer
Patrick M. Byrne, president and CEO of Overstock.com
Dirk Gates, founder and CEO of Xircom and Xirrus
Jeff Hammerbacher, founder of Cloudera
Angie Hicks, founder and CMO of AngiesList.com
Zach Klein, co-founder of social networking site Vimeo
Nord Krauskopf, founder of K&K Insurance; NASCAR Winston Cup Series race car owner (1966–1977)
Russell W. Kruse, auctioneer, founder of Kruse International
Cook Lougheed, philanthropist, entrepreneur, and Allen County Councilman
Dale W. McMillen, founder of Central Soya
Cosette Simon, philanthropist, politician, first female Mayor of Fort Wayne (1985)
Chuck Surack, philanthropist, founder of Sweetwater Sound
Dave Thomas, founder of Wendy's International 
Kevin Wall, Emmy Award-winning producer, environmentalist, founder of Live Earth
Childe Wills, associate of Henry Ford
Fred Zollner, industrialist, founder of the NBA and Fort Wayne Zollner Pistons

Inventors and scientists

Sylvanus Bowser, inventor of the gas pump
Philo T. Farnsworth, inventor of the television
John Henry Holland, pioneer in the field of genetic algorithms

Media

Julia Barr, two-time Daytime Emmy award-winning actress, All My Children
Jill Bennett, actress
Nicole Briscoe, 1998 Miss Illinois Teen USA, host of ESPN2's NASCAR Now
Eric Bruskotter, actor
Dan Butler, actor
Ann Colone, broadcaster, talkshow host
Jenna Fischer, Emmy-nominated actress, The Office
Sharon Gabet, actress
Hilliard Gates, sportscaster
Molly Hagan, actress
Drake Hogestyn, actor
Neil LaBute, director, screenwriter, playwright
Stephanie Larimore, model, Playboy Playmate of the Month
Carole Lombard, Oscar-nominated actress, My Man Godfrey
Shelley Long, Golden Globe and Emmy-winning actress, Cheers
Marilyn Maxwell, actress
Patrick McVey, actor
Bree Olson, pornographic actress
Robert Rusler, actor
Andrea Russett, actress, Internet celebrity
Chris Schenkel, sportscaster
Jan Schweiterman, actor
Carrie M. Shoaff, artist, author, potter, playwright, correspondent
Herb Shriner, comedian, game show host
Nancy Snyderman, MD, journalist, NBC News chief medical editor
Zuzanna Szadkowski, actress
Lyn Thomas, actress
Randy Thompson, actor
David Turnley, photographer
Peter Turnley, photographer
Herb Vigran, actor
Dick York, Emmy-nominated actor, Bewitched

Music

Joey Allen, glam metal guitarist, Warrant
Jeoffrey Benward, contemporary Christian singer, songwriter
Sonny Charles, soul singer, Checkmates, Ltd., Steve Miller Band
Daniel E. Gawthrop, contemporary classical composer
Heather Headley, Tony and Grammy Award-winning Broadway actress and R&B singer
Edwin C. Metcalfe, saxophonist with Spike Jones
Megan Mullins, Country singer
Niyoki, gospel musician
Amanda Perez, R&B singer
Petra, Grammy-winning Christian rock band
Jon Schaffer, heavy metal guitarist, songwriter, Iced Earth
Troy Shondell, rock and roll singer, songwriter
Jordan Witzigreuter, pop singer (stage name The Ready Set)
Addison Agen, singer and finalist on The Voice

Physicians and medical researchers
Alice Hamilton, MD, first woman on faculty of Harvard Medical School; sister of Edith Hamilton
Jane Henney, MD, first woman Commissioner of the FDA (1998–2001)
Leonard A. Scheele, MD, seventh U.S. Surgeon General (1948–1956)
Susan Smalley, Ph.D., first to conduct genome-wide study in ADHD
Allen Steere, MD, identifier of Lyme disease

Public servants

E. Ross Adair, U.S. Representative (1951–1971), United States Ambassador to Ethiopia (1971–1974)
Robert E. Armstrong, Fort Wayne Mayor (1975–1979), Allen County Councilman (1990–2002)
Paul W. Baade, major general in the United States Army
Harry W. Baals, Fort Wayne mayor (1934–1947, 1951–1954)
Paul Frank Baer, first flying ace in American military aviation
Henry C. Berghoff, Fort Wayne Mayor (1901–1906) and co-founder of the Herman J. Berghoff Brewing Company
Tim Berry, Indiana State Treasurer (1999–2007), Indiana State Auditor (2007–2013), Indiana Republican Party Chairman (2013–present)
Samuel Bigger, Indiana State Representative (1834–1835), Indiana Circuit Court Judge (1835–1840), seventh Governor of Indiana (1840–1843)
James W. Borden, judge and diplomat
Randy Borror, Indiana State Representative (2001–2010)
Claude Bowers, writer, U.S. Ambassador to Spain (1933–1939), U.S. Ambassador to Chile (1939–1953)
Samuel Brenton, U.S. Representative (1851–1853, 1855–1857)
Susan Brooks, Deputy Mayor of Indianapolis (1998–1999), U.S. Attorney for Southern Indiana (2001–2007), U.S. Representative (2013–present)
James R. Clapper, Director of National Intelligence (2010–2017)
Daniel R. Coats, U.S. Representative (1981–1989), United States Ambassador to Germany (2001–2005), U.S. Senator (1989–1999, 2011–present)
Walpole G. Colerick, U.S. Representative (1879–1883)
Joseph K. Edgerton, U.S. Representative (1863–1865)
Shirley Adele Field, judge, Oregon State Representative (1956–1960, 1962–1966)
Dan Flanagan, lawyer, Justice of the Indiana Supreme Court (1953-1954), Allen County Republican Party leader
Eliza George, Civil War nurse (1863–1865)
Phil GiaQuinta, Indiana State Representative (2006–present)
George W. Gillie, U.S. Representative (1939–1949)
Timothy Goeglein, White House Office of Public Engagement and Intergovernmental Affairs Deputy Director (2001–2008)
Allen Hamilton, Allen County sheriff (1824–1826), Fort Wayne Postmaster (1825–1831), Allen County Auditor, Clerk, and Recorder (1831–1838)
Mitch Harper, Indiana State Representative (1978–1990), Fort Wayne City Councilman (2008–2016)
Paul Helmke, Fort Wayne Mayor (1988–2000), President of Brady Campaign to Prevent Gun Violence (2006–2011), Founder of the Civic Leaders Center at Indiana University (2013-). 
Tom Henry, Fort Wayne City Councilman (1984–2004), Fort Wayne Mayor (2008–present)
Richard E. Hoagland, U.S. Ambassador to Tajikistan (2003–2006), U.S. Ambassador to Kazakhstan (2008–2011), Principal Deputy Assistant Secretary of State for South and Central Asia (2013–2015)
William J. Hosey, Fort Wayne Mayor (1905–1909, 1913–1917, 1921–1925, 1929–1934)
Merchant W. Huxford, doctor, Fort Wayne Mayor (1845–1849)
Samuel D. Jackson, U.S. Senator (1944)
Paul G. Jasper, Justice of the Indiana Supreme Court (1949-1953)
Matt Kelty, politician, architect
Edward H. Kruse, U.S. Representative (1949–1951)
Henry Lawton, U.S. Army General (1861–1865, 1867–1899), namesake of Lawton, Oklahoma
Thomas R. Marshall, 27th Governor of Indiana (1909–1913), 28th U.S. Vice President (1913–1921)
Hugh McCulloch, first Comptroller of the Currency (1863–1865), U.S. Secretary of the Treasury (1865–1869, 1884–1885)
Robert Meyers, Fort Wayne Mayor (1954–1959), Allen County Superior Court Judge (1971–1985)
Winfield Moses, Fort Wayne City Councilman (1972–1979), Mayor (1980–1987), Indiana State Representative (1992–2012)
Cherrish Pryor, Indiana State Representative (2008–present)
Ben Quayle, U.S. Representative (2011–2013)
Graham Richard, entrepreneur, Fort Wayne Mayor (2000–2008)
James M. Robinson, judge, U.S. Representative (1897–1905)
Mark Souder, U.S. Representative (1995–2010)
Harold J. Warner, Oregon Supreme Court Chief Justice (1955–1957)
James Bain White, U.S. Representative (1887–1889)
George W. Wood, first Fort Wayne Mayor (1840–1841)
James Worden, twelfth Fort Wayne Mayor (1865-1866), Justice of the Indiana Supreme Court (1858-1865, 1871-1882)

Religious leaders

Herman Joseph Alerding, bishop of Roman Catholic Diocese of Fort Wayne-South Bend (1900–1924)
John Chapman, Swedenborgian, nurseryman, missionary, famous American folklore figure Johnny Appleseed
John Michael D'Arcy, auxiliary bishop of Archdiocese of Boston (1974–1985), bishop of Roman Catholic Diocese of Fort Wayne-South Bend (1985–2009)
William Edward McManus, auxiliary bishop of Archdiocese of Chicago (1967–1976), bishop of Roman Catholic Diocese of Fort Wayne-South Bend (1976–1985)
Archbishop John F. Noll, bishop of Roman Catholic Diocese of Fort Wayne-South Bend (1925–1956), founder of Our Sunday Visitor
Wilhelm Sihler, Lutheran minister and founder of Concordia Theological Seminary
Alexa Suelzer, Roman Catholic nun, author, educator, theologian
Robert Thieme, author, Pastor of Berachah Church (1950–2003)

Miscellaneous

Charlie Brandt, serial killer
Dean Corll, serial killer
Alexander Ewing, soldier during the American Revolutionary War and the War of 1812, later a founding resident of Fort Wayne
Florence M. Montgomery, art historian and curator
Alixa Naff, historian
ML Procise, concert sound engineer
Margaret Ringenberg, aviator
Ernest Gottlieb Sihler, professor of classics at New York University
Art Smith, aviator
Homer Van Meter, infamous bank robber who worked with John Dillinger

References

Fort Wayne
Fort Wayne